The Petersen House is a building in Stockholm, Sweden, erected between 1645 and 1659 from construction drawings by Christian Julius Döteber.

See also 

 Herman Petersen
 List of castles in Sweden

Further reading

External links 

 

Buildings and structures in Stockholm